Allsvenskan 2008, part of the 2008 Swedish football season, was the 84th Allsvenskan season played. The first match was played on 30 March 2008 and the last matches were played on 9 November 2008.

Participating clubs

Managers

League table

Results

Relegation play-offs

1–1 on aggregate. Brommapojkarna won on away goals.

Top scorers

References 

Online

External links

Allsvenskan seasons
Swed
Swed
1